Eubrychius is a genus of beetles belonging to the family Curculionidae.

The species of this genus are found in Europe.

Species:
 Eubrychius aquaticus Thomson, 1859 
 Eubrychius lecontei Dietz, 1896

References

Curculionidae
Curculionidae genera